Jaco Bekker (born 17 May 1983) is a South African rugby union player.

References

South African rugby union players
Eastern Province Elephants players
Leopards (rugby union) players
Griquas (rugby union) players
Rugby union players from Port Elizabeth
Living people
1983 births
Rugby union centres